Acraga ferruginea is a moth of the family Dalceridae. It is found in southern Brazil. The habitat consists of subtropical wet and moist forests.

The length of the forewings is 12 mm for males and 17 mm for females. The forewings are brownish rusty red and the hindwings are brownish rusty red, but paler along the costal margin. Adults are on wing in March, June, July, September and October.

References

Dalceridae
Moths described in 1922